Kalevi Pakarinen (27 November 1935 – 19 May 1999) was a Finnish fencer. He competed in the individual and team épée events at the 1960 Summer Olympics.

References

External links
 

1935 births
1999 deaths
Finnish male épée fencers
Olympic fencers of Finland
Fencers at the 1960 Summer Olympics
Sportspeople from Helsinki